Damien Maudet (born 14 November 1996) is a French politician from La France Insoumise. He was elected to the National Assembly in Haute-Vienne's 1st constituency in the 2022 French legislative election.

See also 

 List of deputies of the 16th National Assembly of France

References 

Living people
1996 births
La France Insoumise politicians
21st-century French politicians
Deputies of the 16th National Assembly of the French Fifth Republic

University of Limoges alumni
Members of Parliament for Haute-Vienne